British Poetry since 1945 is a poetry anthology edited by Edward Lucie-Smith, first published in 1970 by Penguin Books. The anthology is a careful attempt to take account of the whole span of post-war British poetry   including poets from The Group, a London-centred workshop for whom Lucie-Smith himself had once been chairman (following the departure of founder Philip Hobsbaum).

While the first section, "Sources," includes older poets such as Robert Graves, John Betjeman and Dylan Thomas, the second section "New Voices" not only includes Seamus Heaney but also Liverpool poets Adrian Henri, Roger McGough and Brian Patten who at the time were not accepted by mainstream critics (although they were featured in the best-selling The Mersey Sound anthology from 1967).

Lucie-Smith wrote in the introduction:

The first edition of the anthology was reprinted several times.  A revised edition appeared in 1985; it omitted some poets and added new ones.  The new sections recognised the increasing influence of the Northern Irish and "university" poets.

Poets in British Poetry since 1945 (first edition) 

A. Alvarez - Kingsley Amis - George Barker - Patricia Beer - Martin Bell - Francis Berry - John Betjeman - D. M. Black - Thomas Blackburn - Alan Bold - Alan Brownjohn - Basil Bunting - Miles Burrows - Charles Causley - Barry Cole - Tony Connor - Iain Crichton Smith - Peter Dale - Donald Davie - Lawrence Durrell - D. J. Enright - Paul Evans - Ian Hamilton Finlay - Roy Fisher - John Fuller - Roy Fuller - Robert Garioch - David Gascoyne - Karen Gershon - Henry Graham - W. S. Graham - Robert Graves - Harry Guest - Thom Gunn - Michael Hamburger - Ian Hamilton Finlay - Lee Harwood - Spike Hawkins - Seamus Heaney - John Heath-Stubbs - Adrian Henri - Geoffrey Hill - Philip Hobsbaum - Anselm Hollo - Ted Hughes - Elizabeth Jennings - Brian Jones - David Jones - Philip Larkin - Peter Levi - Christopher Logue - Edward Lucie-Smith - George MacBeth - Norman MacCaig - Hugh MacDiarmid - Roger McGough - George Mackay Brown - Louis MacNeice - Barry MacSweeney - Derek Mahon - Matthew Mead - Christopher Middleton - Adrian Mitchell - Dom Moraes - Edwin Morgan - Edwin Muir - Jeff Nuttall - Stewart Parker - Brian Patten - Sylvia Plath - Peter Porter - Tom Raworth - Peter Redgrove - Jon Silkin - Stevie Smith - Bernard Spencer - Jon Stallworthy - Nathaniel Tarn - Dylan Thomas - D. M. Thomas - Anthony Thwaite - Charles Tomlinson - Rosemary Tonks - Gael Turnbull - Vernon Watkins - David Wevill

Poets in British Poetry since 1945 (second edition) 

The following poets in the first edition are not in the second edition:

Paul Evans - Spike Hawkins - Anselm Hollo - Barry MacSweeney - Stewart Parker - Rosemary Tonks

The following were added:

David Constantine - Douglas Dunn - James Fenton - Tony Harrison - Michael Longley - Medbh McGuckian - Andrew Motion -  Paul Muldoon - Tom Paulin - Craig Raine - Peter Scupham - C. H. Sisson - Ken Smith - David Sweetman - George Szirtes - R. S. Thomas - Kit Wright

See also
 1970 in poetry
 1970 in literature
 English poetry
 Irish poetry
 List of poetry anthologies

Notes and references

1970 poetry books
1970 anthologies
British poetry anthologies
20th-century British literature